Leopoldo Andara (born 27 June 1986) is a Venezuelan swimmer. He participated at the 2008 Summer Olympics.

Early life and education
Leopoldo was born on 27 June, 1986 in Miranda, Venezuela. He moved to Florida, but competed in the 2008 Summer Olympics as a Venezuelan native. He received a Bachelor of Arts in Psychology from Florida International University in 2010. In 2014, he received a Master’s Degree in Mental Health Counseling from Nova Southeastern University.

International and national competitions

2011
 Venezuela national team member Pan-American Games Guadalajara Mexico.

2010
 1st Place Medley Relay South American Games Medellin Colombia.
 2nd Place 200 meters Individual Medley South American Games Medellin Colombia.
 1st Place Medley Relay Central American Games Puerto Rico.
 3rd Place 200 meters Breaststroke Central American Games Puerto Rico.
 Venezuela National Team Member for FINA World Swimming Championships (25M) 2010 Dubai. 
 Venezuela National Champion in 100-200 Breaststroke, and 200-400 Individual Medley.

2009
 9th Place FINA World Cup Swimming World Cup 400 meters Individual Medley.
 Venezuelan National Record in 200–400 meters Individual Medley.
 Venezuelan National Champion in 100-200 Breaststroke, and 200-400 Individual Medley.

2008
 National Team Member at Beijing Olympics, participant in 200 meters Breaststroke and 200 meters Individual Medley.
 2nd Place 200 meters Individual Medley Bahamas International Championship.
 2nd Place 100 meters Breaststroke Bahamas International Championship.
 1st Place 200 meters Breaststroke Bahamas International Championship.
 Venezuelan National Champion in 100-200 Breaststroke, and 200-400 Individual Medley.

2007
 8th Place 200 yards Butterfly SEC's Championship.
 8th Place 200 meters Breaststroke Pan-American Games Rio, Brazil.
 9th Place 200 meters Individual Medley Pan-American Games Rio, Brazil.
 Venezuelan National Champion in 100-200 Breaststroke, and 200-400 Individual Medley.

2006
 NJCAA Champion in 200 yards Butterfly, and 200-400 yards Individual Medley.
 NJCAA MVP and National record in 200 yards Butterfly [].
 3rd Place 200 meters Breaststroke Central American Games Cartagena, Colombia.
 3rd Place 200 meters Individual Medley South American Championship Argentina.
 Venezuelan National Champion in 100-200 Breaststroke, 200-400 Individual Medley, and 200 Butterfly.

2005
 NJCAA Champion in 200 yards Butterfly, and 200-400 yards Individual Medley.
 NJCAA MVP.
 2nd Place 200 meters Individual Medley Bolivarian Games Colombia.
 2nd Place 200 meters Breaststroke Bolivarian Games Colombia.
 Venezuelan National Champion in 100-200 Breaststroke, 200-400 Individual Medley, and 200 Butterfly.

2004
 2nd Place 200 meters Breaststroke South American Games Montevideo, Uruguay.
 Venezuela National Team Member for FINA World Swimming Championships (25M) Indianapolis.
 Venezuelan National Champion in 200 Breaststroke, 200-400 Individual Medley, and 200 Butterfly.

2003
 1st Place 400 meters Individual Medley Central American Championship Mexico City, Mexico .
 3rd Place 100 meters Breaststroke Central American Championship Mexico City, Mexico.
 2nd Place 200 meters Breaststroke Central American Championship Mexico City, Mexico.
 Venezuelan National Champion in 100-200 Breaststroke, 200-400 Individual Medley, and 200 Butterfly.

2002
 2nd Place 200 meters Breaststroke South American Championship Belem, Brazil.
 2nd Place 200 meters Individual Medley South American Championship Belem, Brazil.
 2nd Place 400 meters Individual Medley South American Championship Belem, Brazil.
 Venezuelan National Champion in 100-200 Breaststroke, 200-400 Individual Medley, and 200 Butterfly.

2001
 1st Place 400 meters Individual Medley Central American Championship Dominican Republic.
 1st Place 200 meters Breaststroke Central American Championship Dominican Republic.
 1st Place 200 meters Individual Medley Central American Championship Dominican Republic.
 1st Place 200 meters Butterfly Central American Championship Dominican Republic.
 2nd Place 200 meters Individual Medley South American Championship Medellin, Colombia.
 2nd Place 200 meters Butterfly South American Championship Medellin Colombia.
 2nd Place 100 meters Breaststroke South American Championship Medellin Colombia.
 Venezuelan National Champion in 100-200 Breaststroke, 200-400 Individual Medley.

2000
 Venezuelan National Champion in 100-200 Breaststroke, 200-400 Individual Medley

References

Actually:
https://www.teamunify.com/Contact.jsp?team=fgyobcw

https://olympics.com/en/athletes/leopoldo-jose-andara-gonzalez

1988 births
Living people
Venezuelan male swimmers
Male breaststroke swimmers
Male medley swimmers
Olympic swimmers of Venezuela
Swimmers at the 2008 Summer Olympics
Pan American Games competitors for Venezuela
Swimmers at the 2007 Pan American Games
Swimmers at the 2011 Pan American Games
Competitors at the 2010 Central American and Caribbean Games
Central American and Caribbean Games gold medalists for Venezuela
South American Games silver medalists for Venezuela
South American Games bronze medalists for Venezuela
South American Games medalists in swimming
Competitors at the 2002 South American Games
Central American and Caribbean Games medalists in swimming